The Busmannkapelle Memorial (Gedenkstätte Busmannkapelle) is a building on Sophie Street in Dresden. It is a reconstruction of the Busmannkapelle and has been under construction since 2009 (with completion planned for 2011), though planning began in 1995. It is a memorial to the Sophienkirche, lost in the bombing in 1945.

Museums in Dresden
Rebuilt buildings and structures in Dresden